The following lists events that happened during 1890 in South Africa.

Incumbents
 Governor of the Cape of Good Hope and High Commissioner for Southern Africa:Henry Brougham Loch.
 Governor of the Colony of Natal: Charles Bullen Hugh Mitchell.
 State President of the Orange Free State: Francis William Reitz.
 State President of the South African Republic: Paul Kruger.
 Prime Minister of the Cape of Good Hope: John Gordon Sprigg (until 16 July), Cecil John Rhodes (starting 16 July).

Events

March
 17 – The first railway line in the Transvaal, known as the Randtram, is opened for service between Boksburg and Braamfontein in Johannesburg.

June
 6 – Magadu Bhambada becomes chief of the AmaZondi people at the age of 25 after the death of his father and uncle.
 23 June – President Paul Kruger of the South African Republic institutes a Second Volksraad which is responsible for controlling local matters.

July
 17 – Cecil Rhodes becomes Prime Minister of the Cape Colony.

Births
 26 October – Percy Hansen, Danish soldier in British service, recipient of the Victoria Cross. (d. 1951)

Deaths

Railways

Railway lines opened
 1 February – Cape Western – Somerset West to Sir Lowry's Pass Village, .
 28 March – Natal – Glencoe Junction to Talana, .
 15 May – Natal – Glencoe Junction to Newcastle, .
 13 October – Transvaal – Braamfontein to Springs, .
 17 November – Transvaal – Braamfontein to Roodepoort, .
 1 December – Cape Western – Kalkbaai to Simon's Town, .

 1 December – Cape Western – Kimberley to Vryburg, .
 17 December – Cape Midland – Colesberg Junction to Norvalspont bridge, .
 17 December – Free State – Norvalspont bridge to Bloemfontein, .

Locomotives
Cape
 The Cape Government Railways places twenty 5th Class 4-6-0 tender locomotives in mainline service on its Midland and Western Systems.
 The first of four Clara Class 0-6-2 tender locomotives are placed in service by the Cape Copper Company on its  narrow gauge Namaqualand Railway between Port Nolloth and O'okiep.

Transvaal
 The Nederlandsche-Zuid-Afrikaansche Spoorwegmaatschappij (NZASM) of the Zuid-Afrikaansche Republiek (Transvaal Republic) places six 18 Tonner saddle-tank locomotives in service on construction work on the Delagoa Bay line.

References

History of South Africa